Josue Deprez (born 30 October 1981) is a Haitian judoka.

He competed at the 2016 Summer Olympics in Rio de Janeiro, in the men's 73 kg, where he was eliminated by Igor Wandtke in the first round.

References

1981 births
Living people
Haitian male judoka
Olympic judoka of Haiti
Judoka at the 2016 Summer Olympics